The Capote Mountain Tuff is a geologic group in Texas. It preserves fossils dating back to the Paleogene period.

See also

 List of fossiliferous stratigraphic units in Texas
 Paleontology in Texas

References
 

Geology of Texas
Paleogene stratigraphic units of North America